The 1960 FIVB Men's World Championship was the fourth edition of the tournament, organised by the world's governing body, the FIVB. It was held from 28 October to 11 November 1960 in Brazil.

Teams

Pool A
  (Host)
  (withdrew)
 
 

Pool B
 
 
 

Pool C
 
 
 

Pool D
 
 
 

Pool E
  (withdrew)
  (withdrew)

Results

First round

Pool A

|}

Location: Santo André

|}

Location: Santos

|}

Pool B

|}

Location: Santos

|}

Location: Santo André

|}

Location: São Paulo

|}

Pool C
Location: São Paulo

|}

|}

Pool D
Location: Belo Horizonte

|}

|}

Pool E
Location: Belo Horizonte

|}

|}

Final round
The results and the points of the matches between the same teams that were already played during the first round are taken into account for the final round.

11th–14th places

|}

Location: Volta Redonda

|}

Location: Resende

|}

Final places

|}

Location: Rio de Janeiro

|}

Location: Niterói

|}

Location: Rio de Janeiro

|}

Location: Niterói

|}

Location: Rio de Janeiro

|}

Location: Niterói

|}

Location: Rio de Janeiro

|}

Location: Niterói

|}

Location: Rio de Janeiro

|}

Location: Niterói

|}

Location: Rio de Janeiro

|}

Location: Niterói

|}

Location: Rio de Janeiro

|}

Location: Niterói

|}

Location: Rio de Janeiro

|}

Location: Niterói

|}

Location: Rio de Janeiro

|}

Location: Niterói

|}

Location: Rio de Janeiro

|}

Final standing

External links
 Federation Internationale de Volleyball

FIVB Men's World Championship
V
FIVB Volleyball Men's World Championship
International sports competitions in Rio de Janeiro (city)
International volleyball competitions hosted by Brazil